The Fly Cop is a 1917 American silent comedy film featuring Oliver Hardy. Like many American films of the time, The Fly Cop was subject to cuts by city and state film censorship boards. The Chicago Board of Censors required cuts in scenes of a man pulling an artificial leg from a girl and of a girl pulling her skirt above her knees while walking across a wet floor.

Cast
 Billy West as The Fly Cop
 Oliver Hardy as Proprietor (credited as Babe Hardy)
 Bud Ross as Handyman (credited as Budd Ross)
 Leo White as The Mayor
 Ellen Burford as Forelady
 Charles Slattery as Chief of Police
 Ethelyn Gibson as A Chicken (credited as Ethlyn Gibson)

See also
 List of American films of 1917
 Oliver Hardy filmography

References

External links

1917 films
1917 short films
American silent short films
American black-and-white films
1917 comedy films
Films directed by Arvid E. Gillstrom
Silent American comedy films
American comedy short films
Censored films
1910s American films